Chymotrypsin-like elastase family member 3A is an enzyme that in humans is encoded by the CELA3A gene.

Function 

Elastases form a subfamily of serine proteases that hydrolyze many proteins in addition to elastin. Humans have six elastase genes which encode the structurally similar proteins elastase 1, 2, 2A, 2B, 3A, and 3B. Unlike other elastases, elastase 3A has little elastolytic activity. Like most of the human elastases, elastase 3A is secreted from the pancreas as a zymogen and, like other serine proteases such as trypsin, chymotrypsin and kallikrein, it has a digestive function in the intestine. Elastase 3A preferentially cleaves proteins after alanine residues. Elastase 3A may also function in the intestinal transport and metabolism of cholesterol. Both elastase 3A and elastase 3B have been referred to as protease E and as elastase 1.

References

Further reading

External links